Suchon may refer to:

People with the surname:
 Eugen Suchoň (1908–1993) Slovak composer
 Gabrielle Suchon (1632–1703), French moral philosopher

People with the given name:
Suchon Sa-nguandee (born 1982), Thai footballer

Other:
Suchon, a Jamoat of Tajikistan